Richard Venture (born Richard Charles Venturella; November 12, 1923 – December 19, 2017) was an American actor. He performed in more than eighty films from 1964 to 2001. His television guest-credits include The Days and Nights of Molly Dodd, Fame, Street Hawk and Murder, She Wrote. Venture died just 31 days prior to ex-wife actress Olivia Cole, in December 2017 at the age of 94.

Venture was born in New York City.

He debuted on Broadway in Dinosaur Wharf (1951). His other Broadway credits included The National Health (1974), Chemin de Fer (1973), The Visit (1973), Murderous Angels (1971), Solitaire / Double Solitaire (1971)
Double Solitaire (1971), and The Merchant of Venice (1951).

Venture wed actress Grayce Grant in 1946, and they divorced in 1971. They had four children. He was married to actress Olivia Cole from 1971 until their divorce in 1984. He and Lorraine Venture married in 1984 and divorced in 1995. He was married to Katherine Catalano-Venture in 2003 until his death in 2017.

Venture served in the United States Navy during World War II.

Filmography

References

External links
 

1923 births
2017 deaths
American male film actors
American male television actors
Male actors from New York City
20th-century American male actors
United States Navy personnel of World War II